Džiugas Slavinskas (born November 11, 1998) is a professional Lithuanian basketball player. He can play both small forward and power forward positions.

Professional career
Slavinskas started his professional career when he signed with Neptūnas-Akvaservis in summer 2014.

References

1998 births
Living people
BC Neptūnas players
Lithuanian expatriate basketball people in Spain
Lithuanian men's basketball players
People from Pasvalys
Small forwards